This is a list of events held and scheduled by Deep (often stylized as DEEP), a mixed martial arts organization based in Japan.

The first event, Deep - 1st Impact, took place on January 8, 2001.

Events

Event locations
These cities have hosted Deep events up to Deep - Tokyo Impact: Lightweight GP 2013 opening round.

  Japan (197)
 Tokyo – 112
 Nagoya - 29
 Osaka - 17
 Toyama - 13
 Hamamatsu - 6
 Kasugai - 2
 Mikawa - 2
 Shizuoka - 2
 Kyoto - 2
 Yokohama - 1
 Kitakyushu - 1
 Fukuoka - 1
 Hiroshima - 1
 Hakuba - 1
 Ryūgasaki - 1
 Shinnan'yō - 1
 Sendai - 1
 Fuji - 1
 Ichinomiya - 1
 Okayama - 1
 Kanazawa - 1

See also
List of Deep champions
Deep Jewels events
Jewels (mixed martial arts)

References

External links
 Official website
 DEEP event listings at Sherdog

Japan sport-related lists
Mixed martial arts events lists